Cycle two of Top Model aired from September to November 2007 and featured 13 contestants competing for the title of Norges nye toppmodell. Kathrine Sørland was replaced by Vendela Kirsebom as the host of the competition.

The winner of the competition was 18-year-old Kamilla Alnes from Ålesund.

Episodes

Episode 1 
Original airdate: 3 September 2007
 First call-out: Anette Wiborg
 Bottom two: Ann-Jeanett Angell-Henriksen & Kine Nordeide Johansen
 Eliminated: Ann-Jeanett Angell-Henriksen

Episode 2 
Original airdate: 10 September 2007
 First call-out: Polina Barbasova
 Bottom two: Kine Nordeide Johansen & Kristina Breivik
 Eliminated: Kine Nordeide Johansen

Episode 3 
Original airdate: 17 September 2007
 First call-out: Esther Roe
 Bottom two/eliminated: Kristina Breivik & Kristina Talleraas Holen

Episode 4 
Original airdate: 24 September 2007
 First call-out: Julia Brønn Lyon
 Bottom two: Agathe Høistad Guttuhaugen & Polina Barbasova
 Eliminated: Agathe Høistad Guttuhaugen

Episode 5 
Original airdate: 1 October 2007
 First call-out: Anette Wiborg
 Bottom two: Julia Brønn Lyon & Polina Barbasova
 Eliminated: Julia Brønn Lyon

Episode 6 
Original airdate: 8 October 2007
 First call-out: Ivanna Petrova
 Bottom two: Anette Wiborg & Kaja Hegstad Lilleng
 Eliminated: Kaja Hegstad Lilleng

Episode 7 
Original airdate: 15 October 2007
 First call-out: Kamilla Alnes
 Bottom two: Ivanna Petrova & Silje Løvik
 Eliminated: Silje Løvik

Episode 8 
Original airdate: 22 October 2007
 Eliminated: None

Episode 9 
Original airdate: 29 October 2007
 First call-out: Kamilla Alnes
 Bottom two: Anette Wiborg & Esther Roe
 Eliminated: Anette Wiborg

Episode 10 
Original airdate: 5 November 2007
 First call-out: Polina Barbasova
 Bottom two: Esther Roe & Ivanna Petrova
 Eliminated: Esther Roe

Episode 11 
Original airdate: 12 November 2007

Episode 12 
Original airdate: 19 November 2007
 Final three: Ivanna Petrova, Kamilla Alnes & Polina Barbasova
 Norges nye toppmodell: Kamilla Alnes

Contestants
(ages stated are at start of contest)

Summaries

Call-out order

 The contestant was eliminated
 The contestant was immune from elimination
 The contestant won the competition

Episode 3 featured a double elimination during a regular judging panel.
In episode 6, Ivanna was immune from elimination for winning the challenge.
In episode 8 there was no elimination.
In episode 10, Polina was immune from elimination for winning the challenge.
In episode 11, there was no judging panel.

Photo Shoot Guide
Episode 1 Photoshoot: Last Supper in Lingerie
Episode 2 Photoshoot: Champagne in Prague
Episode 3 Photoshoot: Sunglasses in a Lake
Episode 4 Photoshoot: Burglars
Episode 5 Photoshoot: Murder Victims
Episode 6 Photoshoot: Pin-ups
Episode 7 Photoshoot: Bathtubs in Iceland 
Episode 8 Photoshoot: Shoot with Nude Men
Episode 9 Photoshoot: Styling Oneself
Episode 10 Photoshoot: Action shooting
Episode 11 Photoshoot: Bikinis in Normandy
Episode 12 Photoshoot: Carnival

Judges
Vendela Kirsebom
Jan Thomas
Bjørn Opsahl 
Linda Vasquez
Mariana Verkerk - catwalk and posing coach

References

External links
Official site (Norwegian)
Norway's Next Top Model at the Internet Movie Database

Top Model Norge
2000s Norwegian television series
2007 Norwegian television series debuts
2007 Norwegian television seasons